Hong Kong League Cup 2003–04 is the 4th staging of the Hong Kong League Cup.

The competition was sponsored by Sunray Cave Limited.

The 10 teams from Hong Kong First Division League were divided into 2 groups. The top 2 teams in the groups entered the semi-finals.

Group stage
All times are Hong Kong Time (UTC+8).

Group A

Group B

Knockout stage

Bracket

Semi-finals

Final

Individual Awards 
 Top Scorers: Roger Batoum of Happy Valley, Cornelius Udebuluzor of Buler Rangers, Musa Shannon of Nancheng Real Estate (4 Goals)
 Best Defensive Player: Lau Chi Keung of Sun Hei

Trivia
 There was a pre-match before this League Cup final where La Salle College played against West Island School in the All Hong Kong Schools Jing Ying Football Tournament 2003-04 final. West Island School captured the champion by winning 1-0.

References
 www.rsssf.com Hongkong 2003/04
 HKFA Website 聯賽盃回顧(四) (in chinese)

League Cup
Hong Kong League Cup